Karitsa is a village and a community of the Agia municipality. Before the 2011 local government reform it was a part of the municipality of Evrymenes. The 2011 census recorded 436 inhabitants in the village and 536 in the community. The community of Karitsa covers an area of 23.241 km2.

Administrative division
The community of Palaiopyrgos consists of three separate settlements: 
Agia Paraskevi (population 2,493 in 2015)
Karitsa (population 436)
Kokkino Nero (population 95)
Plateia Ammos (population 3)

Geography
The village is located on the eastern slopes of Mount Ossa overseeing the Aegean Sea.

Population
According to the 2011 census, the population of the settlement of Karitsa was 436 people, a decrease of almost 17% compared with the population of the previous census of 2001.

See also
 List of settlements in the Larissa regional unit

References

Populated places in Larissa (regional unit)